Glycosmis superba is a plant of Borneo in the family Rutaceae. The specific epithet  is from the Latin meaning "splendid", referring to the leaves.

Description

Distribution and habitat
Glycosmis superba is endemic to Borneo. Its habitat is forests from sea-level to  altitude.

References

superba
Endemic flora of Borneo
Plants described in 1978